The South American palm weevil, Rhynchophorus palmarum, is a species of snout beetle. The adults are relatively large black beetles of approximately one and a half inch in length, and the larvae may grow to two inches in length.

Biology and behavior
These insects are attracted to the release of volatile compounds produced by injured palm trees. The larvae burrow through the hearts of palms, and their feeding can potentially kill an infested palm or serve as an avenue for secondary infections of bacterial disease. It is considered an important pest of cultivated coconut, date and oil palms, attacking thirty-five different species in twelve different families. It has also been documented as an occasional pest of sugar cane. This insect serves as vector for the Bursaphelenchus cocophilus nematode — the cause of red ring disease in coconuts, oilpalm, and dates. R. palmarum carries the disease in the form of dauer larvae, a survival form. By the time one observes symptoms, the palm is usually already dead. Weevils are infected while feeding as adults or larvae, but only female weevils carry a large internal infestation around their oviducts and are capable of transmitting the nematode during oviposition. Females are capable of laying as many as 693 eggs. Eggs will hatch in three to five days, and spend seven to eight weeks as larvae, feeding on the heart of the palm. They will emerge from the heart of the palm to pupate in a cocoon woven from palm fibers either in the boot of palm-leaf petioles, or in leaf debris at the base of the palm. Pupation can take from one to three weeks. Adults will live from five to eight weeks.

Host plants
 Cocos nucifera coconut
 Phoenix dactylifera Date Palm
 Elaeis guineensis African Oil Palm
 Euterpe edulis Assai Palm
 Metroxylon sagu Sago Palm
 Phoenix canariensis Canary Island Date Palm
 Mauritia flexuosa Moriche Palm
 Bactris gasipaes Peach Palm
 Oenocarpus bataua

Secondary hosts
 sugarcane
 banana
 Cacao
 custard apple
 breadfruit
 papaya
 citrus
 mango
 avocado
 guava

Distribution
The weevil's native range extends across much of South America from Argentina to Paraguay and north through South and Central America to central Mexico and the Caribbean (Barbados, Dominica, Grenada, Guadeloupe, Martinique, Saint Lucia, Saint Vincent, Grenadines, Trinidad and Tobago, and perhaps Cuba, Dominican Republic, and Puerto Rico. Recent finds in Arizona and Texas do not seem to reflect established populations, but more western populations are established (as of 2010) in Tijuana, Mexico and San Diego County, California (San Ysidro, Bonita, and Spring Valley) and causing serious damage.

Cuisine

The larvae have been consumed for centuries as food by native South American populations as a source of protein, minerals, and vitamins A and E. These beetles and their larvae are known by many common names in South America: cucarrón, cigarrón, casanga, suri (Peru), chontacuro (Ecuador), gualpa (Colombia), mojojoi, mojomoi, mojotoi, mukint, mujin. and are used in traditional medicine for the treatment of cough, asthma and other respiratory ailments.

Notes

References

Citations

Bibliography

External links
 USDA  information site for the weevil
 University of Florida fact sheet for the nematode

Dryophthorinae
Agricultural pest insects
Insect vectors of plant pathogens
Beetles of Central America
Beetles described in 1758
Pests of oil palm